Technology Services Group Limited (TSG) is a British company specialising in managed IT services, business software, telecoms and IT support. The company's head office is based at Team Valley near Newcastle upon Tyne.

The company was established in 2003 by Graham Wylie after the purchase of Newcastle-based Joynson Ltd. TSG is also a business partner of Sage Group, a provider of financial software also co-founded by Wylie. In the years that followed, the company expanded to 13 sites throughout the UK primary through acquisition.

References

External links 
 Technology Services Group

Companies based in Newcastle upon Tyne
Software companies established in 2003
Software companies of the United Kingdom